Sa Kosi Narai railway station is a railway station located in Tha Pha Subdistrict, Ban Pong District, Ratchaburi Province.

References 

Railway stations in Thailand
Ratchaburi province